Shelley Keeney (née White) (born June 24, 1979) is a former state representative from the U.S. state of Missouri having served in the Missouri House of Representatives from 2009 to 2017. She represented Missouri's 145th Legislative District, which consists of all of Bollinger County, Madison County, and the southern portion of Perry County, Missouri. She is a member of the Republican Party.

Electoral history

References

External links
 House website (archived, October 2017)

1979 births
21st-century American politicians
Living people
Republican Party members of the Missouri House of Representatives
People from Bollinger County, Missouri
Southeast Missouri State University alumni
William Woods University alumni
Women state legislators in Missouri
21st-century American women politicians